Argyrostola is a genus of moths of the family Crambidae described by George Hampson in 1896. It contains only one species, Argyrostola ruficostalis, which is found in Rio de Janeiro in  Brazil and in Panama.

The wingspan is 32–44 mm. The forewings are silvery white, with reddish-brown costal and submarginal scales. Both wings have a prominent curved submarginal series of specks.

References

Schoenobiinae
Monotypic moth genera
Taxa named by George Hampson
Moths of South America
Crambidae genera